Hameedullah Khan Tokhi was elected to represent Zabul Province in Afghanistan's Wolesi Jirga, the lower house of its National Legislature, in 2005.

A report on Kandahar prepared at the Navy Postgraduate School characterized him as a "complicated figure".
It stated that he was a former Governor of the Province.
It stated he sat on the Internal Security Committee.

References

Politicians of Zabul Province
Living people
Governors of Kandahar Province
Members of the House of the People (Afghanistan)
Year of birth missing (living people)